Ernst Waldow (22 August 1893 – 5 June 1964) was a German film actor. He appeared in more than 160 films during his career.

Selected filmography

 Rübezahl's Wedding (1916)
 Sin of a Beautiful Woman (1929)
The Green Domino (1935)
 Inkognito (1936)
 Boccaccio (1936)
 The Court Concert (1936)
 When the Cock Crows (1936)
 Game on Board (1936)
 If We All Were Angels (1936)
 The Dreamer (1936)
 The Man Who Was Sherlock Holmes (1937)
 Signal in the Night (1937)
 The Beaver Coat (1937)
 Togger (1937)
 The Divine Jetta (1937)
 When Women Keep Silent (1937)
 Beate's Mystery (1938)
 The Girl of Last Night (1938)
 The Woman at the Crossroads (1938)
 Women for Golden Hill (1938)
 Who's Kissing Madeleine? (1939)
 The Scoundrel (1939)
 Wedding in Barenhof (1942)
 Doctor Crippen (1942)
 Circus Renz (1943)
 A Man With Principles? (1943)
 Beloved Darling (1943)
 Wild Bird (1943)
 Mask in Blue (1943)
 The Wedding Hotel (1944)
 The Enchanted Day (1944)
 Nora (1944)
 Somewhere in Berlin (1946)
 Blum Affair (1948)
 Thank You, I'm Fine (1948)
 Second Hand Destiny (1949)
 How Do We Tell Our Children? (1949)
 I'll Never Forget That Night (1949)
 Scandal at the Embassy (1950)
 One Night Apart (1950)
 The Beautiful Galatea (1950)
 The Black Forest Girl (1950)
 Professor Nachtfalter (1951)
 Maya of the Seven Veils (1951)
 The Dubarry (1951)
 The Blue Star of the South (1951)
 The Heath Is Green (1951)
 Toxi (1952)
 I Can't Marry Them All (1952)
 The Exchange (1952)
 Roses Bloom on the Moorland (1952)
 A Musical War of Love (1953)
 Hocuspocus (1953)
 The Charming Young Lady (1953)
 Scandal at the Girls' School (1953)
 The Mill in the Black Forest (1953)
 Mask in Blue (1953)
 Josef the Chaste (1953)
 The Empress of China (1953)
 Love and Trumpets (1954)
 Sauerbruch – Das war mein Leben (1954)
 The Telephone Operator (1954)
 Fireworks (1954)
 The Little Czar (1954)
 Emil and the Detectives (1954)
 The Happy Village (1955)
 The Forest House in Tyrol (1955)
 Father's Day (1955)
 Alibi (1955)
 Operation Sleeping Bag (1955)
 Three Days Confined to Barracks (1955)
 My Husband's Getting Married Today (1956)
 A Thousand Melodies (1956)
 Regine (1956)
 Two Bavarians in St. Pauli (1956)
 The Heart of St. Pauli (1957)
 The Schimeck Family (1957)
 The Big Chance (1957)
 Between Munich and St. Pauli (1957)
 The Muzzle (1958)
 The Domestic Tyrant (1959)
 Peter Shoots Down the Bird (1959)
 The Last Pedestrian (1960)
 The Haunted Castle (1960)
 Snow White and the Seven Jugglers (1962)

Bibliography
 Kreimeier, Klaus. The UFA Story: A Story of Germany's Greatest Film Company 1918-1945. University of California Press, 1999.

External links

1893 births
1964 deaths
German male film actors
German male silent film actors
Male actors from Berlin
20th-century German male actors